The 70th Wales Rally of Great Britain was the thirteenth and final round of the 2014 World Rally Championship, held from 13 to 16 November, 2014. The rally was won by Sébastien Ogier in his eighth victory of the season, after winning the championship at the previous rally.

Results

Event standings

Special stages

Power Stage 
The "Power Stage" was a 10.81 km (6.72 mi) stage at the end of the rally.

Standings after the rally

WRC

Drivers' Championship standings

Manufacturers' Championship standings

Other 

WRC-2 Drivers' Championship standings

WRC-3 Drivers' Championship standings

JWRC Drivers' Championship standings

References 
Wales Rally GB 2014 – juwra.com/World Rally Archive
70. Wales Rally GB 2014 – ewrc-results.com

Wales Rally GB
Rally GB
Wales Rally GB
Wales Rally GB